Amanita solaniolens or old potato amanita is a species of Amanita from Nova Scotia, Canada.

References

External links
 
 

solaniolens